Xanthomarina spongicola is a Gram-negative, strictly aerobic, rod-shaped and non-motile bacterium from the genus of Xanthomarina which has been isolated from the sponge Hymeniacidon flavia from the coast of Jeju Island.

References

Flavobacteria
Bacteria described in 2011